The Buenos Aires Visual Plan was the first program to establish an organised system of traffic signs in the city of Buenos Aires, developed and implemented  between 1971 and 1972. The plan had been thought by the Buenos Aires administration led by then Intendent Saturnino Montero Ruiz and carried out by the design studio managed by architects Guilermo González Ruiz and Ronald Shakespear.

The program, officially named "Plan for the Design of a Visual Identification System", is regarded as an avant-garde graphic landmark in the Buenos Aires urban design, 

The road signs were later replicated in other cities in Argentina and even in Latin America. The visual plan style has been used as model for future signal systems in Buenos Aires.

Overview 
 
Ronald Shakespear has recognised the work of graphic designer and typographer Jock Kinneir as the main inspiration for the BA Visual Plan. Kinneir, along with his assistant Margaret Calvert, had been designed the road signs in the United Kingdom from 1957 to 1967. Kinneir's sign is considered one of the most ambitious information design projects ever undertaken in the UK, becoming a model for modern road signage in the world. Kinneir and Calvert's system was notable for the use of typography (that included the use of lowercase letters in the signs) and the coordinated use of shapes and chromatic scales to sort the information.

In Shakespear's own words:

The main purpose of the visual plan was to establish an information system which "guided city inhabitants to their destinations without asking anything to anybody".

As part of the visual plan development, all the road and street name signs were redesigned. Before the plan, street name signs were fitted to walls, and then featured different typographies. The González Ruiz/Shakespear studio replaced them with signs located on street corners. Those signs consisted of posts with two plaques attached, each one indicating the street name and way. Those signs also introduced the use of the helvetica font in the urban signal system of Buenos Aires. The Helvetica would be also adopted as the corporate font by the Municipality of Buenos Aires. In more recent years, later revisions of the original signs included advertisement banners on the top of them, something that Shakespear himself complained about.

Although the visual plan is mostly known for its road and information signs, it was indeed a complete visual identity project for the city of Buenos Aires that include elements of corporate identity such as logo, colors, employees uniforms, among other elements.

Other informative elements that were part of the system were the bus stop (colectivos) signs, the hand designed for taxi stops, signs for parks and a simplified version of the coat of arms of Buenos Aires. The taxi stop signal was depicted as a hand (symbolising the way of "hail" a taxi), using the typical yellow and black colors of that vehicles. That signal was also replicated in other cities, nevertheless it was replaced by a simpler version in 2012, during the Mauricio Macri administration.

See also 
 Ronald Shakespear
 Road signs in Argentina

Further reading 
 Señal de Diseño. Memoria de la práctica by Ronald Shakespear – Ed. Infinito, Buenos Aires (2003) –

References

External links 
 Señalización de Buenos Aires at Estudio Shakespear website 

Graphic design
1971 in Argentina
ar